K277BS (103.3 FM; "Z103") is a translator rebroadcasting the classic rock format of the HD3 subcarrier of Leighton Broadcasting's KZPK. Licensed to St. Cloud, Minnesota, it serves the St. Cloud area.  The station is currently owned by Leighton Broadcasting.

History
K277BS signed on-air in 2012, the station was an FM translator for news/talk KNSI.

In 2018, it was announced that K277BS would flip to classic rock as "Z-Rock"; the programming on K277BS would originate from KZPK-HD3. On March 5, 2018 K277BS flipped to Classic Rock as "Z-Rock" relaying KZPK-HD3. The first song on "Z-Rock" was Bohemian Rhapsody by Queen. KNSI signed on a new FM translator (K257GK) at 99.3 MHz, which is KNSI's current FM translator.

In 2021, KZPK HD3/K277BS quietly rebranded as "Real Rock Z103" with no change in format.

The station competes with Townsquare Media's classic rock KLZZ, and Tri-County Broadcasting's active rock WHMH-FM.

Sources

northpine.com (Upper Midwest Broadcasting)
radioinsight.com (RadioInsight)Radio Locator For K277BSfccinfo.com

External links

 
 

Classic rock radio stations in the United States
Radio stations in St. Cloud, Minnesota
Radio stations established in 2012
2012 establishments in the United States